Sidi-Saïd is a town in northern Algeria.

References

Communes of Béjaïa Province